Artur Szafrański (born 25 October 1971) is a Polish speed skater. He competed in the men's 1500 metres event at the 1994 Winter Olympics.

References

1971 births
Living people
Polish male speed skaters
Olympic speed skaters of Poland
Speed skaters at the 1994 Winter Olympics
People from Elbląg